Gary Frangalas (born 6 May 1963) is a former Australian rules footballer who played with the Sydney Swans and Richmond in the Victorian Football League (VFL).

Frangalas, a Clayton recruit, played mostly across half back and half forward. He played with Sydney for three league seasons and didn't miss a single game in 1985. Based in Melbourne during that time, he was one of the Swans players requested by club management to make the move to Sydney for the 1986 season, but he instead joined Richmond, a club he had supported growing up. During his time at Richmond he struggled with injuries, including a torn knee cartilage.

Frangalas joined Victorian Football Association club Dandenong in 1991. He played a part in the team's premiership winning season, but was a late withdrawal from the Grand Final itself due to a shoulder injury.

Frangalas is of Greek descent and is married to wife Sharyn. The couple have three children, Chloe, Amy, and Sam.

References

1963 births
Australian people of Greek descent
Australian rules footballers from Victoria (Australia)
Sydney Swans players
Richmond Football Club players
Dandenong Football Club players
Living people